Gila Hot Springs is an unincorporated community and census-designated place (CDP) in Grant County, New Mexico, United States. It was first listed as a CDP prior to the 2020 census.

The community is on the northern edge of Grant County, in the valley of the West Fork of the Gila River. It is bordered to the north by Catron County. New Mexico State Road 15 passes through the community, leading northwest  to its terminus at Gila Cliff Dwellings National Monument and south  to Silver City, the Grant county seat.

Demographics

References 

Census-designated places in Grant County, New Mexico
Census-designated places in New Mexico